Kaali – Ek Punar Avatar is an Indian soap opera which aired on Star Plus from 3 December 2012 to 8 March 2013. The story was based on the famous Nitish Katara murder case where a mother fights and gets justice for her son.

Before premiere, while under production, it was initially titled as Nyaay but was later renamed Kaali - Ek Punar Avatar.

Overview
Sayali Tyagi falls in love with Nimai Bakshi, a middle-class man. But he gets killed by Sayali's father Rajan and brother Samar, as they don't want this alliance and fake his death as suicide. But Nimai's mother Vaani finds out the truth and seeks justice. She hires Inspector Devendra "Dev" Sandhu to protect her family. Sayali runs away. Lawyer Rajneesh Patak finds and takes her home. As Rajan finds out, he asks Rajneesh to fight his case but Dev finally with evidence arrests Rajan and Samar. Sayali and Rajneesh get married. Dev falls in love and starts a new life with Nimai's sister Paakhi.

Cast

Main
Arjun Bijlani as Dev, Paakhi's love interest
Sonali Nikam as Sayali Tyagi/Sayali Patak, Rajan's daughter, Rajneesh's wife
 Yashwant as Advocate Rajneesh Patak, Rajan's lawyer, Sayali's husband 
Anshul Trivedi as Nimai, Sayali's ex-lover (dead)

Recurring
Aneri Vajani as Paakhi, Nimai's sister, Dev's love interest
 Mangal Kenkre as Vaani, Nimai and Paakhi's mother
Deepak Wadhwa as Samar Tyagi, Sayali's brother, Rajan's son, Nimai's murderer
 Sudhir Nimai as Rajan Tyagi, Sayali and Samar's father
 Ashutosh Tiwari

Reception
The Indian Express stated, "The performances are decent with Sudhir Nimai's Tyagi leading the pack. He's certainly one of the most watchable villains television has produced so far, Mangal Kenkre makes Vaani Rajhans her own as she lends the role with the right amount of tenderness and toughness, and Anshul Trivedi as good boy Nimai is endearing. All we wish is that the story be tighter and the pace quickened."

References

External links
 Official Website

StarPlus original programming
2012 Indian television series debuts
2013 Indian television series endings
Indian drama television series